Cryptophasa is a genus of moths of the family Xyloryctidae.

Species

 Cryptophasa aethoptera Meyrick, 1938
 Cryptophasa aglaodes (Lower, 1893)
 Cryptophasa albacosta Lewin, 1805
 Cryptophasa alphitodes Turner, 1904
 Cryptophasa amphicroca Meyrick, 1925
 Cryptophasa antalba Diakonoff, 1966
 Cryptophasa argophanta Meyrick, 1917
 Cryptophasa argyrias Turner, 1906
 Cryptophasa argyrocolla Turner, 1917
 Cryptophasa arithmologa Meyrick, 1938
 Cryptophasa atecmarta Turner, 1917
 Cryptophasa balteata (Walker, 1866)
 Cryptophasa blosyra Turner, 1917
 Cryptophasa byssinopis Turner, 1902
 Cryptophasa cannea (Lucas, 1901)
 Cryptophasa catharia Turner, 1917
 Cryptophasa chionacra Diakonoff, 1954
 Cryptophasa chionodes (Turner, 1898)
 Cryptophasa chionosema Meyrick, 1938
 Cryptophasa chionotarsa Meyrick, 1925
 Cryptophasa chlorotis Diakonoff, 1954
 Cryptophasa citrinopa (Lower, 1915)
 Cryptophasa crocochorda Meyrick, 1925
 Cryptophasa crossosticta Meyrick, 1938
 Cryptophasa curialis Meyrick, 1925
 Cryptophasa delocentra (Meyrick, 1890)
 Cryptophasa diplosema (Lower, 1903)
 Cryptophasa ensigera Meyrick, 1925
 Cryptophasa epadelpha (Meyrick, 1890)
 Cryptophasa epixysta Turner, 1917
 Cryptophasa eumorpha (Turner, 1898)
 Cryptophasa flavolineata (Walker, 1864)
 Cryptophasa geron Diakonoff, 1954
 Cryptophasa gypsomera (Lower, 1903)
 Cryptophasa hades Diakonoff, 1954
 Cryptophasa hormocrossa Meyrick, 1925
 Cryptophasa hyalinopa (Lower, 1901)
 Cryptophasa immaculata Scott, 1864
 Cryptophasa insana (Felder & Rogenhofer, 1875)
 Cryptophasa iorhypara Diakonoff, 1954
 Cryptophasa irrorata Lewin, 1805
 Cryptophasa isoneura (Lower, 1902)
 Cryptophasa lasiocosma (Lower, 1908)
 Cryptophasa leucadelpha Meyrick, 1887
 Cryptophasa luciflua Meyrick, 1938
 Cryptophasa malevolens Meyrick, 1928
 Cryptophasa megalorma Meyrick, 1910
 Cryptophasa melanoscia (Lower, 1903)
 Cryptophasa merocentra Meyrick, 1925
 Cryptophasa mesotoma Meyrick, 1925
 Cryptophasa molaris (Lucas, 1900)
 Cryptophasa neocrates Meyrick, 1925
 Cryptophasa nephrosema (Turner, 1898)
 Cryptophasa nesograpta Meyrick, 1925
 Cryptophasa nigricincta (Turner, 1898)
 Cryptophasa niphadobela Diakonoff, 1954
 Cryptophasa nubila (Lucas, 1894)
 Cryptophasa nymphidias Turner, 1926
 Cryptophasa obscura Diakonoff, 1954
 Cryptophasa ochroleuca (Lower, 1892)
 Cryptophasa oecodoma Meyrick, 1930
 Cryptophasa opalina (Turner, 1900)
 Cryptophasa panleuca (Lower, 1901)
 Cryptophasa phaeochtha Meyrick, 1925
 Cryptophasa phaethontia (Meyrick, 1890)
 Cryptophasa phycidoides (Lucas, 1901)
 Cryptophasa platypedimela (Lower, 1894)
 Cryptophasa porphyritis Turner, 1906
 Cryptophasa psammochtha Meyrick, 1925
 Cryptophasa psathyra (Diakonoff, 1948)
 Cryptophasa pseudogramma Meyrick, 1930
 Cryptophasa psilocrossa Turner, 1902
 Cryptophasa psiloderma Diakonoff, 1948
 Cryptophasa pultenae Lewin, 1805
 Cryptophasa ranunculus Diakonoff, 1954
 Cryptophasa rubescens Lewin, 1805
 Cryptophasa rubra (Meyrick, 1890)
 Cryptophasa russata Butler, 1877
 Cryptophasa sacerdos Turner, 1902
 Cryptophasa sarcinota (Meyrick, 1890)
 Cryptophasa semnocrana Meyrick, 1928
 Cryptophasa sepiogramma Meyrick, 1938
 Cryptophasa spilonota Scott, 1864
 Cryptophasa stenoleuca (Lower, 1894)
 Cryptophasa stochastis (Meyrick, 1890)
 Cryptophasa tecta (Lucas, 1894)
 Cryptophasa tetrazona (Lower, 1901)
 Cryptophasa themerodes Turner, 1904
 Cryptophasa vacuefacta Meyrick, 1925
 Cryptophasa watungi Sutrisno & Suwito, 2015
 Cryptophasa xylomima Turner, 1906
 Cryptophasa zorodes Turner, 1917

Former species
 Cryptophasa bipunctata Scott, 1864
 Cryptophasa monoleuca (Lower, 1894) (=Tirathaba monoleuca)
 Cryptophasa sceliphrodes Meyrick, 1925
 Cryptophasa transversella Snellen, 1878

References

 
Xyloryctidae
Xyloryctidae genera